Villa Grande, originally named Mesa Grande is an unincorporated community in Sonoma County, California, United States. Villa Grande has a post office (95486) which was established in 1921.

References

Unincorporated communities in California
Unincorporated communities in Sonoma County, California